Maxmillan Kielbasa (August 23, 1921 – January 12, 1980) was a professional football player for the National Football League's Pittsburgh Steelers in 1946. He was drafted by the Philadelphia-Pittsburgh "Steagles" in the 16th round (147th overall) of the 1943 NFL Draft. Prior to joining the Steelers, Max played college football at Duquesne University. He was inducted into the Duquesne University Sports Hall of Fame on November 27, 1979. After his playing career ended Max became the custodian for the apartment building, which he lived in, in Brentwood, Pennsylvania.

References
Pittsburgh Post Gazette January 14, 1980
Duquesne University Sports Hall of Fame

1921 births
1980 deaths
People from Brownsville, Pennsylvania
Players of American football from Pennsylvania
American football halfbacks
Duquesne Dukes football players
Pittsburgh Steelers players